Bear Creek High School may refer to:

Bear Creek High School (California), an American public high school in Stockton, California
Bear Creek High School (Colorado), an American public high school in Lakewood, Colorado
The Bear Creek School, an American private kindergarten through twelfth grade school in Redmond, Washington